(May 25, 1334 – January 31, 1398) was the third of Emperors of Northern Court during the Period of the Northern and Southern Courts in Japan. According to pre-Meiji scholars, his reign spanned the years from 1348 through 1351.

Genealogy
His personal name was originally Masuhito (益仁), but was later changed to Okihito (興仁).

His father was Emperor Kōgon.  His predecessor, Emperor Kōmyō was his uncle, the younger brother of Emperor Kōgon.

Lady-in-waiting: Niwata (Minamoto) Motoko (庭田（源）資子; d.1394), Niwata Shigemoto's daughter
First son: Imperial Prince Fushimi-no-miya Yoshihito (1351–1416; 伏見宮栄仁親王) (Founder of Fushimi-no-miya house, collateral branch of the Imperial Family and included in the Succession to the Japanese throne until 1947)
Second son: Imperial Prince Priest Koshin (1358–1391; 興信法親王)
Court Lady: Anfuku-dono-Naishi (安福殿女御)
Consort: Sanjō-no-Tsubone (三条局)
First daughter: Princess Suiho (瑞宝女王)
Third son: Imperial Prince Priest Kojo (弘助法親王)

Events of Sukō's life
Sukō occupied the Chrysanthemum Throne from 18 November 1348 until 22 November 1351.

In 1348, he became Crown Prince.  In the same year, he became Northern Emperor upon the abdication of Emperor Kōmyō.  Although Emperor Kōgon ruled as cloistered Emperor, the rivalry between Ashikaga Takauji and Ashikaga Tadayoshi began, and in 1351, Takauji returned to the allegiance of the Southern Court, forcing Emperor Sukō to abdicate.  This was intended to reunify the Imperial Line.

However, the peace soon fell apart, and in April 1352, the Southern Dynasty evacuated Kyoto, abducting with them Retired (Northern) Emperors Emperor Kōgon and Emperor Kōmyō as well as Emperor Sukō and the Crown Prince Tadahito.  Because of this, Takauji made Emperor Kōgon's second son Imperial Prince Iyahito emperor (First Fushimi-no-miya).

Returning to Kyoto in 1357, Emperor Sukō's son Imperial Prince Yoshihito began to work with the Bakufu to be named Crown Prince, but the Bakufu instead decided to make Emperor Go-Kōgon's son (the future Emperor Go-En'yū) Crown Prince instead.

In 1398, Emperor Sukō died.  But, 30 years after his death, in 1428, his great-grandson Hikohito (彦仁), as the adopted son of Emperor Shōkō, became Emperor Go-Hanazono, fulfilling Sukō's dearest wish. Sukō is enshrined at the Daikōmyōji no misasagi (大光明寺陵) in Fushimi-ku, Kyoto.

Eras during his reign
Nanboku-chō Southern court
Eras as reckoned by legitimate Court (as determined by Meiji rescript)
 Shōhei

Nanboku-chō Northern court
Eras as reckoned by pretender Court (as determined by Meiji rescript)
 Jōwa
 Kan'ō

Southern Court rivals
Emperor Go-Murakami

Japanese line of succession
If the current line of the Japanese royal family fails to produce sons (i.e. if the 3 currently in line all fail to produce sons), then it would be Suko's line that would become the main line and most senior of the House of Yamoto in male primogeniture preference (i.e. son to son). Currently (as of 2021) the head of this line is Fushimi Hiroaki, however as he has no sons, the line will become extinct upon his death.

Ancestry

See also
 Emperor of Japan
 List of Emperors of Japan
 Imperial cult

Notes

References

 Ponsonby-Fane, Richard Arthur Brabazon. (1959).  The Imperial House of Japan. Kyoto: Ponsonby Memorial Society. 
 Titsingh, Isaac, ed. (1834). [Siyun-sai Rin-siyo/Hayashi Gahō, 1652], ''Nipon o daï itsi ran; ou,  Annales des empereurs du Japon.''  Paris: Oriental Translation Fund of Great Britain and Ireland.

 
 

Japanese emperors
Suko of Japan
Suko of Japan
Emperor Suko
Emperor Suko
Emperor Suko
14th-century Japanese monarchs
Japanese retired emperors